Guiyeoni (born 1985) is the pen name of internet novelist Lee Yoon-sae (이윤세).

Career
She first reached fame with her novel He Was Cool, which she serialized for 2 months since August of 2001 in Daum's humor threads when she was a 2nd year in high school in Jecheon girl's high school. Subsequent works such as  Romance of Their Own, spawned commercially successful films of the same name, as with another book, A Wolf's Attraction. Since then, one of her other books, Do Re Mi Fa So La Ti Do, has become a film starring Jang Keun-suk. A movie of To My Boyfriend is also in planning stages. Despite her commercial success, Guiyeoni has been criticized for her lack of literary perfection, overuse of emoticons, and unrealistic setting in her works. Besides the aforementioned novels, she has also written Africa, Five Stars, and written and illustrated a manhwa called Syndrome.

Personal life
She married in 2018.

Works

He Was Cool
Do Re Mi Fa So La Ti Do
Finding An Angel
Five Stars
Temptation of Wolves(also known as Romance of Their Own)

References

1985 births
Living people
People from Jecheon
South Korean novelists
South Korean manhwa artists
South Korean manhwa writers
South Korean women writers
South Korean female comics artists
Female comics writers
21st-century pseudonymous writers
Pseudonymous women writers